Avitta ophiusalis is a moth of the family Noctuidae first described by Francis Walker in 1859. It is found in Indian subregion, Sri Lanka, China, Japan, Sundaland, Sulawesi, Queensland, Solomon Islands, Vanuatu, Fiji and New Caledonia.

Forewings narrow and pale grey brown. A faint transverse fasciation present. Conspicuous darker marks are found at the reniform which look like a hawk in flight.

References

Moths of Asia
Moths described in 1859
Catocalinae